Sylvester Hopkins Martin (August 9, 1841 – September 25, 1927) was a Union Army soldier in the American Civil War and a recipient of the United States military's highest decoration, the Medal of Honor, for his actions at the August 19, 1864 Battle of Weldon Railroad (aka Globe Tavern), Virginia.

Biography

Martin joined as a Private in Company A, 23rd Pennsylvania (Three Month) Volunteer Infantry on April 21, 1861, serving in Maryland and Virginia skirmishing against the rebels before mustering out on July 31, 1861. Committed to the cause the Union, he rejoined as a Private in Company F, 88th Pennsylvania Volunteer Infantry on September 14, 1861. He was commissioned as a 2nd Lieutenant on November 11, 1862. Transferred to Company K on January 1, 1863, he was promoted to 1st Lieutenant on February 23, 1863. He was commissioned Captain on January 30, 1865.

He was wounded at Antietam. At chancellorsville, on Sunday, May 3, he was recognized for leading a party of twenty picked men into no man's land to recover entrenching tools that had been abandoned there on Friday and Saturday. At Gettysburg on July 1, 1863, he commanded Company K in the defense of Oak Hill where they inflicted severe casualties on Brig. Gen. Alfred Iverson's brigade. He commanded Company K through the February 7, 1865 Battle of Hatcher's Run. He received the Medal of Honor for his actions at the Battle of Weldon Railroad, or Globe Tavern on August 19, 1864. Due to the severity of his wounds received at Hatcher's Run, he never actually mustered as a captain before mustering out on June 7, 1865.

After the war, Martin returned to Pennsylvania and was elected as a companion of the Pennsylvania Commandery of the Military Order of the Loyal Legion of the United States.

He received his Medal of Honor on April 5, 1894. He died at age 86 and was buried at Mount Moriah Cemetery in his birthplace.

Medal of Honor citation
Martin's official Medal of Honor citation reads:
The President of the United States of America, in the name of Congress, takes pleasure in presenting the Medal of Honor to Lieutenant Sylvester Hopkins Martin, United States Army, for extraordinary heroism on 19 August 1864, while serving with Company K, 88th Pennsylvania Infantry, in action at Weldon Railroad, Virginia. Lieutenant Martin gallantly made a most dangerous reconnaissance, discovering the position of the enemy and enabling the division to repulse an attack made in strong force.

See also

 List of American Civil War Medal of Honor recipients
 88th Pennsylvania Infantry Regiment
 Battle of Gettysburg, first day#Rodes attacks from Oak Hill

Notes/references

Bibliography

External links
 Descendants of the 88th Pennsylvania Volunteer Infantry Regiment
 The Siege of Petersburg Online - Vautier, John D. (88th Pennsylvania)
 PA-Roots - 88th Regiment, Pennsylvania Volunteers, Company F, Recruited at Philadelphia

1841 births
1927 deaths
Military personnel from Philadelphia
Union Army officers
United States Army Medal of Honor recipients
People of Pennsylvania in the American Civil War
American Civil War recipients of the Medal of Honor